Government Autonomous College is a state-run co-ed undergraduate and postgraduate college located in Panposh of city Rourkela, Odisha, India. The college was established in the year 1961 as Government Science College but later on it was renamed as Government Autonomous College. The institution upholds the development of majority of student's mostly coming from economically weaker sections and Scheduled Tribe. The college is Accredited by NAAC with grade ['B'] certification.
Presently Dr. Mr. Bijay Behera is the Principal. The college has also center for Indira Gandhi National Open University for distance learners.

Other courses offered
The college offers two years of Postgraduate degree and Self-financing courses.

The Postgraduate degree includes with streams of:
Master in Commerce (64 Seats)
 Master in English (32 Seats)
 Master in Oriya (32 Seats)
 Master in Economics (32 Seats)
 Master in Education (32 Seats)
 Master in History (32 Seats)
 Master in Philosophy (32 Seats)
 Master in Political science (32 Seats)
 Master in Psychology (32 Seats)
 Master in Sociology (32 Seats)
 Master in Botany (32 Seats)
 Master in Chemistry (32 Seats)
 Master in ETC (Electronics and Tele-Communication) (32 Seats)
 Master in MTC (Mathematics with Computer) (32 Seats)
 Master in Mathematics (32 Seats)
 Master in Statistics (32 Seats)
 Master in Zoology (32 Seats)
 Master in Physics (32 Seats)

The self financing courses includes with streams of:
 M.Sc in Computer science (96 Seats)
 Postgraduate Diploma in Computer Hardware and Networking
 Post Graduate Diploma in Computer Application.
 B.Sc Computer Science & Engineering (Hons) (64 Seats)
 B.Sc Math (Hons) with Computer component (32 Seats)
 B.Sc Electronics & Telecommunication Engineering (Hons) (32 Seats)

See also
 Government Junior College, Rourkela
 Sushilavati Government Women’s College, Rourkela
 Ispat Autonomous College, Rourkela
 Municipal College, Rourkela

References

Colleges affiliated to Sambalpur University
Department of Higher Education, Odisha
Autonomous Colleges of Odisha
Universities and colleges in Rourkela
Educational institutions established in 1961
1961 establishments in Orissa